The Transport and Works Act 1992 (TWA) was established by the Parliament of the United Kingdom to provide a system by which the construction of rail transport, tramway, inland waterway and harbour infrastructure could proceed in the UK by order of the Secretary of State for Transport rather than, as before, on the passing of a private bill.
Permissions granted under the TWA are issued in the form of a Transport and Works Act Order, often abbreviated to TWAO.

Background
The TWA was introduced as a response to criticism by members of Parliament of the private-bill-based approach to the approval of transport infrastructure projects in the UK. Private bills were, from the nineteenth century onwards, the only way to gain authorisation for such infrastructure. However, work associated with the drafting and sponsorship of such bills was viewed by a Joint Committee on Private Bill Procedure, set up in 1987, as unduly onerous for parliamentary representatives. The provisions of the TWA mirrored and augmented the development of the UK planning system in the twentieth century, which provided an alternative route for authorisation of certain planning matters.

References

External links

Transport and Works Act 1992 Standard Note - House of Commons Library

1992 in law
1992 in transport
Railway Acts
Transport policy in the United Kingdom
United Kingdom Acts of Parliament 1992
History of transport in the United Kingdom
Transport legislation